The B.B. Comer Memorial Library is a library located in Sylacauga, Alabama. The library was named to the National Register of Historic Places on September 6, 2005.

The library was founded in 1936 as the Sylacauga Public Library. It was moved three years later, and after a $5,000 grant by the family B. B. Comer, the library was renamed in his honor. The library was again renamed to Isabel Anderson Comer Museum and Arts Center in 1962. It was created with a marble exterior, and was originally built through the Works Progress Administration.

References

Libraries on the National Register of Historic Places in Alabama
Streamline Moderne architecture in the United States
Library buildings completed in 1939
National Register of Historic Places in Talladega County, Alabama
Works Progress Administration in Alabama
1936 establishments in Alabama
Libraries established in 1936